The remains of the Orphir Round Church (or Round Kirk), dedicated to Saint Nicholas, are located in Orphir Parish on the Mainland of Orkney, Scotland. It has been a scheduled monument since 2014.

Description 
It consisted of a circular nave about six metres in diameter with a semicircular apse with a central window. The walls are one metre thick.

History 
It is thought to have been built by jarl (earl) Haakon Paulsson (earl from 1103 to 1123) as penance for murdering his cousin and co-ruler Magnus Erlendsson (later Saint Magnus) in the late 11th or early 12th century. According to the Orkneyinga saga, earl Haakon took sole power in 1117 after the killing of Magnus, and the round kirk was later rededicated to St Magnus. The saga refers to a "large drinking-hall" with a "magnificent church" nearby. The remains of the drinking hall, known as the Earl's Bu, can still be seen, as well as a later Norse horizontal watermill.

It is the oldest surviving round church in Scotland, which are rare, the only other round medieval church in Scotland, is found at Roxburgh near the English border. The building's design was inspired by the Church of the Holy Sepulchre in Jerusalem because at the time the Crusades were occurring and the circular church became popular design with returning crusaders attempting to copy the famous structure.

Modern Church 
Almost the whole church survived until 1757, when most of it was demolished to provide stone for the new parish kirk, which has also now been demolished. Only the apse and a small segment of the round kirk's nave wall now survive. The site is now in the care of Historic Environment Scotland and is open to the public. The remains are protected as a scheduled monument.

Archaeology 
Geophysical surveys have proved to not be very effective in investigating the remains of the church but excavations have been more effective in understanding the history and development of the church.

Images

References

External links

Round churches
11th-century church buildings in Scotland
12th-century church buildings in Scotland
11th-century establishments in Scotland
12th-century establishments in Scotland
Archaeological sites in Orkney
Scheduled Ancient Monuments in Orkney
Churches in Orkney
Scandinavian Scotland
Historic Environment Scotland properties
Mainland, Orkney